Owen A. Galvin (1852–1897) was an American attorney and politician who served as the United States Attorney for the District of Massachusetts from 1887 to 1890.

Early life
Galvin was born on June 21, 1852 to Patrick and Mary (Hughes) Galvin. After attending Boston public schools, he studied law in the office of Charles F. Donnelly. He graduated from Boston University School of Law in 1876 and was admitted to the bar on February 29 of that year. On July 3, 1879 he married Jennie T. Sullivan. They would go on to have three sons, Stephen P. Galvin, Augustus H. Galvin, and Frederick S. Galvin.

Massachusetts General Court
Galvin was elected to the Massachusetts House of Representatives in 1881. He served on the House's committees on education and constitutional amendments.

From 1882 to 1884 he was a member of the Massachusetts Senate. He served on the Senate's committees on liquor law, labor, education, judiciary, and election laws as well as on the special committee on penal and charitable institutions. In 1884 he was the Democratic candidate for President of the Massachusetts Senate.

United States Attorney
In July 1886, Galvin was appointed by George M. Stearns to serve as the Assistant United States Attorney for the District of Massachusetts. When Stearns resigned in September 1887, Galvin was chosen by President Grover Cleveland to succeed him as United States Attorney for the District of Massachusetts. He resigned in October 1889, but his resignation was not accepted until May 1890.

Later career
In 1889, Galvin was a candidate for Mayor of Boston. He won the Democratic nomination, but lost to Republican incumbent Thomas N. Hart.

In 1891 he was appointed by Governor William Russell to serve on the Charles River Improvement Commission, who named Galvin their chairman. The Commission's work led to the design initiatives of Charles Eliot, Arthur Shurcliff, and Guy Lowell. This designed landscape now includes over 20 parks and natural areas along 19 miles (31 km) of shoreline, from the New Dam at the Charlestown Bridge to the dam near Watertown Square.

In 1892 he unsuccessfully challenged incumbent Nathan Matthews, Jr. for the Democratic nomination for Mayor.

Death
Galvin died on December 18, 1897 in Boston.

See also
 103rd Massachusetts General Court (1882)

References

1852 births
1897 deaths
Boston University School of Law alumni
Lawyers from Boston
Democratic Party members of the Massachusetts House of Representatives
Democratic Party Massachusetts state senators
United States Attorneys for the District of Massachusetts
19th-century American politicians
19th-century American lawyers